Released in 2001,01 is the seventh solo album by the Slovak singer Richard Müller. Müller wrote most of the lyrics and, due to the death of his favourite composer Jaro Filip, Müller also composed half of the music. The album was critically well received, and placed at number 9 in the Czech musicserver.cz's list of the 25 best Czech and Slovak albums of the decade.

Track listing 
 "Už asi nie si" (Richard Müller, Müller) – 3:49
 "Spočítaj ma" (Müller, Jaro Filip) – 4:33
 "2 líšky" (Ivan Tásler, Müller) – 6:10
 "Cítim" (Müller, Müller) – 4:08
 "Do čista" (Müller, Müller) – 4:03
 "Studňa" (Tásler / Vlado Krausz) – 3:42
 "Ako vánok" (Marcel Buntaj, Tásler, Müller, Filip) – 3:09
 "Rieka" (Tásler, Müller) – 5:05
 "Ráno" (Müller, Filip) – 5:22
 "Nahý II" (Tásler, Müller) – 3:59
 "Planý poplach duše" (Filip, Müller) – 5:39
 "Ucim sa javu" (hehe);– 6:66

12th track of album is 1:09 excerpt of early version of Planý poplach duše song sung by song composer Jaro Filip.

See also 
 1st Aurel Awards

References

External links 
 Album on official website of Richard Müller  
 Album review on musicserver.cz  
 Album review on idnes.cz  

2001 albums
Richard Müller (singer) albums
Slovak-language albums
Universal Music Group albums
Albums produced by Ivan Tásler